Kronshagen is a municipality in the district of Rendsburg-Eckernförde, in Schleswig-Holstein, Germany. It is situated approximately 23 km southeast of Eckernförde, and 3 km west of Kiel.

References

Rendsburg-Eckernförde